Procinolol is a beta adrenergic receptor antagonist, a group of pharmaceutical drugs that lower heart rhythm and blood pressure.

It is not known to be marketed anywhere in the world in 2021.

References

Beta blockers
Cyclopropanes
N-isopropyl-phenoxypropanolamines